Aparna Nancherla (born August 22, 1982) is an American comedian and actress of Indian descent. She has appeared on Inside Amy Schumer and has written for Late Night with Seth Meyers and Totally Biased with W. Kamau Bell. Nancherla released her debut comedy album Just Putting It Out There through Tig Notaro's Bentzen Ball Records on July 8, 2016.

Early life 
Aparna Nancherla was born in Washington, D.C., United States into an Indian Telugu Hindu family; her parents immigrated to the United States from Hyderabad, India in the 1970s. She has an older sibling, Bhavana. 

She grew up outside Washington, attending Thomas Jefferson High School for Science and Technology in Fairfax County, Virginia. Nancherla attended Amherst College in Amherst, Massachusetts and studied psychology.

Career 
After graduating from college she returned to Washington, D.C., where she began her standup career. Nancherla moved to Los Angeles, then to New York City to write for Totally Biased until the show's cancellation in 2013. Nancherla was subsequently a staff writer for Late Night with Seth Meyers in 2015.

Nancherla's credits also include several web series, including Your Main Thing with John Early, and co-created and starred in Womanhood, a satirical advice series with comedian Jo Firestone.

In 2019 she was featured in Laughing Matters, a 30-minute YouTube documentary created by SoulPancake in collaboration with Funny or Die wherein a variety of comedians discuss mental health.

Appearances

Live-action
Nancherla has appeared on Conan and Comedy Central's The Meltdown with Jonah and Kumail. Variety named her to its list of "Top 10 Comics to Watch for 2016" and The New York Times said that Nancherla "has become a comic in demand for her quirky, relatable and punchy humor." She is also the co-host of Blue Woman Group, which the Daily Beast calls "a hilarious podcast about depression."

In 2016, Comedy Central announced that Nancherla will record a half-hour special for the network.

In 2017, she played a ramen blogger in season two of Master of None, had a recurring role in the first two seasons of the HBO series Crashing, which aired from 2017 to 2018, and played Grace in the Comedy Central series Corporate, which aired from 2017 to 2020.

In March 2018 she appeared on the Netflix's series, The Standups. She also made her feature debut in the 2018 film, A Simple Favor.

In 2020, she appeared on Netflix's series, Space Force as Pella Bhat.

Voice acting
In 2017, she voiced Kishy in the short-lived animated series Ginger Snaps.

In seasons four, five and six of BoJack Horseman, from 2017 to 2020, Nancherla had a recurring voice role as BoJack's alleged daughter, but actual half-sister, Hollyhock Manheim-Mannheim-Guerrero-Robinson-Zilberschlag-Hsung-Fonzerelli-McQuack. She also voiced Mrs. Singh in Fancy Nancy, from 2018 to 2022.

In the season 5 Steven Universe episode "Legs from Here to Homeworld", which aired in December 2018, she voiced Nephrite, the uncorrupted form of the Centipeetle Mother, and Jades in the Season 5 episode "Together Alone", which also aired in December 2018. In the Bob's Burgers season 9 episode "UFO No You Didn't", which aired in December 2018, she voiced Susmita, Tina’s science partner. She returned to voice Susmita in the "Fast Time Capsules at Wagstaff School" episode.

From 2020 to 2022, she voiced the recurring character Meena in the Disney Junior series Mira, Royal Detective.

Since January 2021, she has voiced Moon Tobin in the Fox animated series, The Great North. In October 2021, she voiced the guest character, Sheela, in The Ghost and Molly McGee.

In 2022, Nancherla voiced Chelsea Hill in the adult animated series, Fairview, She also provided guest voices for the series Central Park, and supporting characters such as Oddjobs and Opie in Summer Camp Island.

In March 2023, she voiced a librarian named Miss Moufflé in Kiff. She is also scheduled to voice a character in an animated adaptation of Frog and Toad.

Filmography
{| class="wikitable sortable"
|-
! Year
! Title
! Role
! class="unsortable" | Notes
|-
| 2012–2013
| Totally Biased with W. Kamau Bell
| Herself / various
| 9 episodes; also writer
|-
| 2014
| The Chris Gethard Show
| Scrompin Nompin Nompin
| Episode: "The Crowd Sourced Character Contest 3"
|-
| 2015
| The Jim Gaffigan Show
| Herself
| Episode: "Go Shorty, It's Your Birthday"
|-
| rowspan="3" | 2016
| Netflix Presents: The Characters
| Aparna
| Episode: "Natasha Rothwell"
|-
| Inside Amy Schumer
| Aparna / Barista
| 2 episodes
|-
| Nightcap
| Herself
| Episode: "IBS-ISIS"
|-
| rowspan="4" | 2017
| Love
| Lauren
| Episode: "Friends Night Out"
|-
| Master of None
| Stephanie
| Episode: "First Date"
|-
| Ginger Snaps
| Kishy (voice)
| 6 episodes
|-
| HarmonQuest
| Beauflecks DeVrye
| Episode: "Bonebreak Village"
|-
| 2017–2019
| Crashing
| Anaya
| 6 episodes
|-
| 2017–2020
| BoJack Horseman
| Hollyhock Manheim-Mannheim-Guerrero-Robinson-Zilberschlag-Hsung-Fonzerelli-McQuack (voice)
| 13 episodes
|-
| rowspan="5" | 2018
| 2 Dope Queens
|
| Episode: "Hair"
|-
| High Maintenance
| Daria
| Episode: "#goalz"
|-
| Animals.
| Dawn
| Episode: "At a Loss for Words When We Needed Them Most or...The Rise and Fall of GrabBagVille"
|-
| A Simple Favor
| Sona
|
|-
| Steven Universe
| Jades / Nephrite (voice)
| 2 episodes
|-
| 2018–2020
| Bob's Burgers
| Susmita (voice)
| Episode: "UFO No You Didn't," "Fast Time Capsules at Wagstaff School," and "FOMO You Didn't"
|-
| 2018–2020
| Corporate
| Grace Ramaswamy
| 22 episodes
|-
| 2019
| You're Not a Monster
| Nia Emissiona (voice)
| 10 episodes
|-
| rowspan="5" | 2020
| Mythic Quest: Raven's Banquet
| Michelle
| 5 episodes; also writer and co-producer
|-
| Mira, Royal Detective
| Meena (voice)
| 4 episodes
|-
| Space Force
| Pella Bhat
| 3 episodes
|-
| Love Life
| Naomi
| Episode: "Magnus Lund"
|-
| Golden Arm
| Coco Cherie
|
|-
| 2020-2021
| Summer Camp Island
| Oddjobs / Opie (voices)
| Episodes: "Oddjobs" / Arc "Betsy and the Ghost"
|-
| 2021-present
| The Great North
| Moon (voice)
| Series regular
|-
| 2021-present
| The Ghost and Molly McGee
| Sheela (voice)
| Recurring
|-
| rowspan="3" | 2022
| Search Party
| Dr. Benny Balthazar
| 5 episodes
|-
| Fairview| Chelsea Hill (voice)
| Series regular
|-
| Lopez vs Lopez| Dr. Pocha
| recurring role
|}

 Works 
 

 Discography 
 Just Putting It Out There'' (2016) – CD/Download

References

External links
 

1982 births
Living people
American people of Telugu descent
American Hindus
American actresses of Indian descent
American comedians of Indian descent
21st-century American actresses
21st-century American comedians
21st-century American women writers
American comedy writers
American stand-up comedians
American television actresses
American television writers
American voice actresses
American women comedians
American women television writers
Amherst College alumni
Comedians from Washington, D.C.
Screenwriters from Washington, D.C.
21st-century American screenwriters
Thomas Jefferson High School for Science and Technology alumni